Virgall Joemankhan (17 November 1968 – 7 June 1989) was a Dutch footballer. During his career, he played for AFC Ajax and Cercle Brugge. He died at the age of 20, when on 7 June 1989, he was killed in the Surinam Airways Flight PY764 air crash in Paramaribo.

Career
At Ajax, although he reached the A1 squad, Joemankhan and Dennis Bergkamp were both relegated to the A2 squad due to unprofessional conduct. While Bergkamp fought hard to improve his behaviour and his skills, Joemankhan chose to leave Ajax and play for Cercle Brugge in Belgium.

Although Joemankhan made his professional debut at Cercle Brugge, his reputation for partying continued. Along with his friend, Tom Krommendijk, a Feyenoord player on loan at Cercle with a similar reputation, they were often found together enjoying the nightlife in Bruges and Amsterdam.

He was invited by Colourful 11 founder Sonny Hasnoe to be part of the team travelling to Suriname to play in the "Boxel Kleurrijk Tournament" against three Surinamese teams. On 7 June 1989 Surinam Airways Flight PY764 crashed during approach to Paramaribo-Zanderij International Airport, killing 176 of the 187 passengers on board, including Joemankhan, making it the worst ever aviation disaster in Suriname's history. Among those killed were 15 members of the 18-member Colourful 11 contingent.

Tom Krommendijk returned to Feyenoord for the 1989–90 season, but was sent on loan to FC Twente for the following season. He never played for Twente: on 25 August 1990 he was killed when his car collided with a tree, over a year after Joemankhan's death.

References
 Joemankhan at AndroKnel.nl 
 Crash report
 Iwan Tol: Eindbesteming Zanderij; het vergeten verhaal van het Kleurrijk Elftal 
 

1968 births
1989 deaths
Dutch footballers
Dutch sportspeople of Surinamese descent
Dutch people of Indian descent
AFC Ajax players
Cercle Brugge K.S.V. players
Footballers from Amsterdam
Belgian Pro League players
Dutch expatriate footballers
Dutch expatriate sportspeople in Belgium
Expatriate footballers in Belgium
Association footballers not categorized by position
Footballers killed in the Surinam Airways Flight 764 crash